Men Without Law is a 1930 American Western film directed by Louis King and starring Buck Jones, Carmelita Geraghty, Thomas Carr, Lydia Knott, and Harry Woods. The film was released by Columbia Pictures on October 15, 1930.

Cast
Buck Jones as Buck Healy
Carmelita Geraghty as Juanita del Rey
Thomas Carr as Tom Healy (as Tommy Carr)
Lydia Knott as Mrs. Healy
Harry Woods as Murdock
Fred Burns as Sheriff Jim
Syd Saylor as Hank
Fred Kelsey as Deputy Sheriff Jeff
Ben Corbett as Pug - Henchman
Donald Reed as Ramon del Rey
Hector V. Sarno as Francisco del Rey (as Hector Sarno)
Silver as Silver - Buck's Horse
Tom Bay as Tom - Henchman (uncredited)
Bob Burns as Posse Rider (uncredited)
Bob Card as Soldier on Train (uncredited)
Lafe McKee as Townsman (uncredited)
Art Mix as Henchman (uncredited)
Bill Nestell as Big Henchman (uncredited)
George Plues as George - Henchman (uncredited)
John Wallace as Peg-Leg (uncredited)

References

External links

1930 Western (genre) films
American Western (genre) films
1930 films
American black-and-white films
Columbia Pictures films
Films directed by Louis King
1930s American films
1930s English-language films